Megalorhipida prolai is a moth of the family Pterophoridae that is found in the Comoros, Eswatini, Madagascar, Mozambique and Zambia.

References

Oxyptilini
Moths described in 1994
Moths of Africa